Subida a Urkiola is a one-day cycling race in Durango, Biscay of the Basque Country. The route starts in Durango and ends at the Sanctuary of Urkiola. The first edition began in 1931 and is organized by the Sociedad Ciclista Bilbaina, but has not been held consistently until 1984 to present. Since 2005, the race is organized as a 1.1 event on the UCI Europe Tour.

Winners

External links 
 Official Site 

Cycle races in the Basque Country
Recurring sporting events established in 1931
1931 establishments in Spain
UCI Europe Tour races